Euthalia merta, the dark-male baron, is a butterfly of the family Nymphalidae (Limenitidinae). It is found in the Indomalayan realm.

Subspecies
E. m. merta Assam to Peninsular Malaya, Singapore
E. m. apicalis  (Vollenhoven, 1862)  Borneo
E. m. pseudomerta  Fruhstorfer, 1906 Sumatra
E. m. prisca  Fruhstorfer, 1913  Bangka
E. m. phantasma  Fruhstorfer, 1913  Nias
E. m. pseuderiphyle  Fruhstorfer, 1913 
E. m. karina  Kalis, 1933 Sabang 
E. m. milleri  Pendlebury, 1939  Langkawai Is.
E. m. tioma  Eliot, 1978  Pulau Tioman
E. m. schoenigi Schröder & Treadaway, 1978  Philippines (Negros)

References

merta
Butterflies described in 1859